Cruz Alta Department is a department located in the east of the Tucumán Province, Argentina. In 2001 its population was 162,240 (2nd in the province) largely located in the Banda del Río Salí-Alderetes Area (northwest). The Department seat is the city of Banda del Río Salí.

Geography
Plains occupy all of the department’s total area (1,255 km²) stretching from the outskirts of the Greater San Miguel de Tucumán Area in the west to the Santiago del Estero Province border in the east. The Salí river forms its western boundary.

Adjacent districts
Burruyacú Department – north
Leales Department – south
Lules, Capital and Tafí Viejo departments – west
Santiago del Estero Province – east

Cities, towns and comunas rurales
Alderetes
Banda del Río Salí
Colombres
Delfín Gallo
El Bracho y El Cevilar
El Naranjito
La Florida y Luisiana
Las Cejas
Los Bulacio y Los Villagra
Los Pereyras
Los Pérez
Los Ralos
Ranchillos y San Miguel
San Andrés

Transportation infrastructure

Major highways
National Route 9
Tucuman Province Routes: 302, 303, 304, 306, 320, 321.

Airports
 Benjamín Matienzo International Airport located in Cebil Pozo

External links
 Tucuman Province Government Website

Departments of Tucumán Province